Víctor Gutiérrez may refer to:

 Víctor Gutiérrez (footballer) (born 1978), Mexican football player
 Víctor Gutiérrez (water polo) (born 1991), Spanish water polo player
 Víctor Manuel Gutiérrez (1922–1966), Guatemalan labour leader
 Victor M. Gutierrez, freelance writer who made false claims against Michael Jackson; see 1993 child sexual abuse accusations against Michael Jackson